Masjid-e-Tooba or Tooba Mosque also known as Gol Masjid, is located in the city of Karachi, Sindh the province of Pakistan. It is situated in the phase 2 of DHA (Defence Housing Authority), Karachi.

The construction of the mosque began in 1966 and completed in 1969. The mosque was designed by Pakistani architect  Babar Hamid Chauhan and the engineer was Zaheer Haider Naqvi. This mosque has the capacity to hold up to 5,000 people. It has one dome without any pillars/columns with the area of 67 meters (213 ft). It has a total area of 4657m².

Mosque's unique feature
 Claims to be the largest single-dome mosque in the world with no pillars in its central prayer hall. Its huge dome is supported on a low surrounding wall.
 18th largest mosque in the world as of 2018

See also 
 List of mosques in Pakistan
 List of largest mosques in the world

References

External links
Enlarged photo of Masjid e Tooba on gettyimages.com website

20th-century mosques
Mosques in Karachi
Mosque buildings with domes